In economics, an intrinsic theory of value (also called theory of objective value) is any theory of value which holds that the value of an object or a good or service is intrinsic, meaning that it can be estimated using objective measures. Most such theories look to the process of producing an item, and the costs involved in that process, as a measure of the item's intrinsic value. Paradigmatically, money is supposed to be good, but not intrinsically good: it is supposed to be good because it leads to other good things, such as buying better teaching equipments at a local primary school. The explanation aims to differentiate the original meaning of intrinsic value from the actual physical benefit it has. 

The labour theory of value is an early example of an intrinsic theory, which was originally proposed by Adam Smith and further developed by David Ricardo and Karl Marx. Similarly, the physiocrats based their theory of value in the land.

See also 

Instrumental and intrinsic value
Marginalism
Socialist economics

References 

 

Theory of value (economics)